Panayiotis Tetsis (Greek: Παναγιώτης Τέτσης; 1925 – 5 March 2016) was a Greek painter. Tetsis was an exponent of the post-impressionistic seascape tradition.

Life and work 

Born in 1925 on the island of Hydra, where he spent his childhood and early teenage years, Tetsis moved to Piraeus in 1937.

Legacy 
Though the artist depicts marine themes that are familiar to him - mostly set against the backdrop of Hydra and Sifnos.
“If I take a long voyage at sea, I get bored,” Tetsis says, “and I don't agree with Cavafy that headed for Ithaca we ought to hope that the voyage lasts as long as possible.” And he added: “I paint a large number of my seas from memory. I don’t need to paint them from life. And even if I do, I change them later in my studio, even changing them totally.” 

Balancing discipline and emotion, Tetsis regards himself as a painter driven by the senses. His singularity, according to Koutsomallis, consists in his combination of “elegiac colour tones, compositional clarity and precision, thematic variety, a monumental character and freely, openly sketched contours”.

In 1949 Tetsis along with Nikos Hadjikyriakos-Ghikas, Yannis Moralis, Nikos Nikolaou, Nikos Engonopoulos and Yiannis Tsarouchis, established the "Armos" art group.

See also 
 Yiannis Tsarouchis
 Nikos Engonopoulos
 Nikos Nikolaou
 Nikos Hadjikyriakos-Ghikas
 Yannis Moralis

References

External links 
 Tetsis exhibition at the Goulandris Museum in Andros

20th-century Greek painters
1925 births
2016 deaths
21st-century Greek painters
People from Hydra (island)
Members of the Academy of Athens (modern)